Enigmavasum is a genus of sea snails, marine gastropod mollusks in the family Turbinellidae.

Species
Species within the genus Enigmavasum include:

 Enigmavasum enigmaticum Poppe, & Tagaro, 2005

References

Turbinellidae
Monotypic gastropod genera